Mogens Machon (born 7 October 1934) is a Danish footballer. He played in six matches for the Denmark national football team from 1957 to 1958.

References

External links
 

1934 births
Living people
Danish men's footballers
Denmark international footballers
Place of birth missing (living people)
Association footballers not categorized by position